

Events

Pre-1600
534 BC – Thespis of Icaria becomes the first recorded actor to portray a character on stage.
1248 – Conquest of Seville by Christian troops under King Ferdinand III of Castile.
1499 – Pretender to the throne Perkin Warbeck is hanged for reportedly attempting to escape from the Tower of London. He had invaded England in 1497, claiming to be the lost son of King Edward IV of England.
1531 – The Second War of Kappel results in the dissolution of the Protestant alliance in Switzerland.

1601–1900
1644 – John Milton publishes Areopagitica, a pamphlet decrying censorship.
1733 – The start of the 1733 slave insurrection on St. John in what was then the Danish West Indies.
1808 – French and Poles defeat the Spanish at Battle of Tudela.
1863 – American Civil War: Battle of Chattanooga begins: Union forces led by General Ulysses S. Grant reinforce troops at Chattanooga, Tennessee, and counter-attack Confederate troops.
1867 – The Manchester Martyrs are hanged in Manchester, England, for killing a police officer while freeing two Irish Republican Brotherhood members from custody.
1876 – Corrupt Tammany Hall leader William Magear Tweed (better known as Boss Tweed) is delivered to authorities in New York City after being captured in Spain.
1890 – King William III of the Netherlands dies without a male heir and a special law is passed to allow his daughter Princess Wilhelmina to succeed him.

1901–present
1910 – Johan Alfred Ander becomes the last person to be executed in Sweden.
1914 – Mexican Revolution: The last of U.S. forces withdraw from Veracruz, occupied seven months earlier in response to the Tampico Affair.
1921 – Warren G. Harding, 29th President of the United States, signs Willis–Campbell Act, into law, prohibiting doctors from prescribing beer or liquor for medicinal purposes.
1924 – Edwin Hubble's discovery, that the Andromeda "nebula" is actually another island galaxy far outside our own Milky Way, is first published in The New York Times.
1934 – An Anglo-Ethiopian boundary commission in the Ogaden discovers an Italian garrison at Walwal, well within Ethiopian territory. This leads to the Abyssinia Crisis.
1940 – World War II: Romania becomes a signatory of the Tripartite Pact, officially joining the Axis powers.
1943 – World War II: The Deutsche Opernhaus on Bismarckstraße in the Berlin neighborhood of Charlottenburg is destroyed. It will eventually be rebuilt in 1961 and be called the Deutsche Oper Berlin.
  1943   – World War II: Tarawa and Makin atolls fall to American forces.
1944 – World War II: The Lotta Svärd Movement is disbanded under the terms of the armistice treaty in Finland after the Continuation War.
1946 – French naval bombardment of Hai Phong, Vietnam, kills thousands of civilians.
1955 – The Cocos Islands are transferred from the control of the United Kingdom to that of Australia.
1959 – French President Charles de Gaulle declares in a speech in Strasbourg his vision for "Europe, from the Atlantic to the Urals".
1963 – The BBC broadcasts An Unearthly Child (starring William Hartnell), the first episode of the  first story from the first series of Doctor Who, which is now the world's longest running science fiction drama.
1971 – Representatives of the People's Republic of China attend the United Nations, including the United Nations Security Council, for the first time.
1972 – The Soviet Union makes its final attempt at launching the N1 rocket.
1974 – Sixty Ethiopian politicians, aristocrats, military officers, and other persons are executed by the provisional military government.
1976 – Jacques Mayol is the first man to reach a depth of 100 m undersea without breathing equipment.
1978 – Cyclone kills about 1,000 people in eastern Sri Lanka.
  1978   – The Geneva Frequency Plan of 1975 goes into effect, realigning many of Europe's longwave and mediumwave broadcasting frequencies.
1980 – The 6.9  Irpinia earthquake shakes southern Italy with a maximum Mercalli intensity of X (Extreme), killing 2,483–4,900, and injuring 7,700–8,934.
1981 – Iran–Contra affair: Ronald Reagan signs the top secret National Security Decision Directive 17 (NSDD-17), giving the Central Intelligence Agency the authority to recruit and support Contra rebels in Nicaragua.
1985 – Gunmen hijack EgyptAir Flight 648 en route from Athens to Cairo. When the plane lands in Malta, Egyptian commandos storm the aircraft, but 60 people die in the raid.
1991 – Queen lead singer Freddie Mercury announces in a statement that he is HIV-positive. He dies the following day.
1992 – The first smartphone, the IBM Simon, is introduced at COMDEX in Las Vegas, Nevada.
1996 – Ethiopian Airlines Flight 961 is hijacked, then crashes into the Indian Ocean off the coast of Comoros after running out of fuel, killing 125.
2001 – The Convention on Cybercrime is signed in Budapest, Hungary.
2003 – Rose Revolution: Georgian president Eduard Shevardnadze resigns following weeks of mass protests over flawed elections.
2004 – The Holy Trinity Cathedral of Tbilisi, the largest religious building in Georgia, is consecrated.
2005 – Ellen Johnson Sirleaf is elected president of Liberia and becomes the first woman to lead an African country.
2006 – A series of bombings kills at least 215 people and injures 257 others in Sadr City, making it the second deadliest sectarian attack since the beginning of the Iraq War in 2003.
2007 – , a cruise liner carrying 154 people, sinks in the Antarctic Ocean south of Argentina after hitting an iceberg near the South Shetland Islands. There are no fatalities.
2009 – The Maguindanao massacre occurs in Ampatuan, Maguindanao, Philippines; 58 opponents of Andal Ampatuan Jr. are kidnapped and killed.
2010 – Bombardment of Yeonpyeong: North Korean artillery attack kills two civilians and two marines on Yeonpyeong Island, South Korea.
2011 – Arab Spring: After 11 months of protests in Yemen, Yemeni president Ali Abdullah Saleh signs a deal to transfer power to the vice president, in exchange for legal immunity.
2015 – Blue Origin's New Shepard space vehicle became the first rocket to successfully fly to space and then return to Earth for a controlled, vertical landing.
2018 – Founders of Italian fashion brand Dolce & Gabbana issue an apology following a series of offensive advertisements on social media promoting a fashion show in Shanghai, China, which was canceled.
2019 – The last Sumatran rhinoceros in Malaysia, Imam, dies, making the species officially extinct in the country.

Births

Pre-1600
 870 – Alexander, Byzantine emperor (d. 913)
 912 – Otto I, Holy Roman Emperor (d. 973)
1190 – Pope Clement IV (d. 1268)
1221 – Alfonso X of Castile (d. 1284)
1402 – Jean de Dunois, French soldier (d. 1468)
1417 – William FitzAlan, 16th Earl of Arundel, English politician (d. 1487)
1496 – Clément Marot, French poet (d. 1544)
1508 – Francis, Duke of Brunswick-Lüneburg, youngest son of Henry the Middle (d. 1549)
1553 – Prospero Alpini, Italian physician and botanist (d. 1617)

1601–1900
1632 – Jean Mabillon, French monk and scholar (d. 1707)
1641 – Anthonie Heinsius, Dutch lawyer and politician (d. 1720)
1687 – Jean Baptiste Senaillé, French violinist and composer (d. 1730)
1705 – Thomas Birch, English historian and author (d. 1766)
1715 – Pierre Charles Le Monnier, French astronomer and author (d. 1799)
1719 – Spranger Barry, Irish actor (d. 1777)
1749 – Edward Rutledge, American captain and politician, 39th Governor of South Carolina (d. 1800)
1760 – François-Noël Babeuf, French journalist and activist (d. 1797)
1781 – Theodor Valentin Volkmar, German lawyer and politician, 1st Mayor of Marburg (d. 1847)
1785 – Jan Roothaan, Dutch priest, 21st Superior-General of the Society of Jesus (d. 1853)
1803 – Theodore Dwight Weld, American author and activist (d. 1895)
1804 – Franklin Pierce, American general, lawyer, and politician, 14th President of the United States (d. 1869)
1820 – Isaac Todhunter, English mathematician and author (d. 1884)
1837 – Johannes Diderik van der Waals, Dutch physicist and thermodynamicist, Nobel Prize laureate (d. 1923)
1838 – Stephanos Skouloudis, Greek banker and politician, 97th Prime Minister of Greece (d. 1928)
1858 – Albert Ranft, Swedish actor and director (d. 1938)
1860 – Hjalmar Branting, Swedish journalist and politician, 16th Prime Minister of Sweden, Nobel Prize laureate (d. 1925)
1864 – Henry Bourne Joy, American businessman (d. 1936)
1868 – Mary Brewster Hazelton, American painter (d. 1953)
1869 – Valdemar Poulsen, Danish engineer (d. 1942)
1871 – William Watt, Australian accountant and politician, 24th Premier of Victoria (d. 1946)
1875 – Anatoly Lunacharsky, Russian journalist and politician (d. 1933)
1876 – Manuel de Falla, Spanish pianist and composer (d. 1946)
1878 – Frank Pick, English lawyer and businessman (d. 1941)
1883 – José Clemente Orozco, Mexican painter (d. 1949)
1886 – Eduards Smiļģis, Latvian actor and director (d. 1966)
1887 – Boris Karloff, English actor (d. 1969)
  1887   – Henry Moseley, English physicist and chemist (d. 1915)
1888 – Harpo Marx, American comedian and musician (d. 1964)
1889 – Harry Sunderland, Australian-English journalist and businessman (d. 1964)
1890 – El Lissitzky, Russian photographer and architect (d. 1941)
1892 – Erté, Russian-French illustrator and designer (d. 1990)
1896 – Klement Gottwald, Czechoslovak politician, President of the Czechoslovak Socialist Republic (d. 1953)
  1896   – Tsunenohana Kan'ichi, Japanese sumo wrestler, the 31st Yokozuna (d. 1960)
1897 – Nirad C. Chaudhuri, British-Indian historian, author, and critic (d. 1999)
  1897   – Karl Gebhardt, German physician and war criminal (d. 1948)
1899 – Manuel dos Reis Machado, Brazilian martial artist and educator (d. 1974)

1901–present
1901 – Bennie Osler, South African rugby player (d. 1962)
1902 – Aaron Bank, American colonel (d. 2004)
  1902   – Victor Jory, Canadian-American actor (d. 1982)
1903 – Joe Nibloe, Scottish footballer (d. 1976)
1905 – K. Alvapillai, Sri Lankan civil servant (d. 1979)
1906 – Betti Alver, Estonian author and poet (d. 1989)
1907 – Lars Leksell, Swedish physician and neurosurgeon (d. 1986)
  1907   – Run Run Shaw, Chinese-Hong Kong businessman and philanthropist, founded Shaw Brothers Studio and TVB (d. 2014)
1908 – Nelson S. Bond, American author and playwright (d. 2006)
1909 – Nigel Tranter, Scottish historian and author (d. 2000)
1912 – George O'Hanlon, American actor and screenwriter (d. 1989)
1914 – Donald Nixon, American businessman (d. 1987)
  1914   – Wilson Tucker, American projectionist and author (d. 2006)
1915 – John Dehner, American actor (d. 1992)
  1915   – Marc Simont, French-American illustrator (d. 2013)
  1915   – Anne Burns, British aeronautical engineer and glider pilot (d. 2001)
1916 – Michael Gough, Malaysian-English actor (d. 2011)
  1916   – P. K. Page, English-Canadian author and poet (d. 2010)
1920 – Paul Celan, Romanian-French poet and translator (d. 1970)
1921 – Fred Buscaglione, Italian singer and actor (d. 1960)
1922 – Manuel Fraga Iribarne, Spanish politician, 3rd President of the Xunta of Galicia (d. 2012)
  1922   – Võ Văn Kiệt, Vietnamese soldier and politician, 6th Prime Minister of Vietnam (d. 2008)
1923 – Daniel Brewster, American colonel, lawyer, and politician (d. 2007)
  1923   – Julien J. LeBourgeois, American admiral (d. 2012)
  1923   – Gloria Whelan, American author and poet
1924 – Irvin J. Borowsky, American publisher and philanthropist (d. 2014)
  1924   – Josephine D'Angelo, American baseball player and educator (d. 2013)
  1924   – Paula Raymond, American model and actress (d. 2003)
  1924   – Colin Turnbull, English-American anthropologist and author (d. 1994)
1925 – José Napoleón Duarte, Salvadoran engineer and politician, President of El Salvador (d. 1990)
  1925   – Johnny Mandel, American composer and conductor (d. 2020)
1926 – Sathya Sai Baba, Indian guru and philosopher (d. 2011)
  1926   – R. L. Burnside, American singer-songwriter and guitarist (d. 2005)
1927 – John Cole, Irish-English journalist and author (d. 2013)
  1927   – Guy Davenport, American author and scholar (d. 2005)
  1927   – Angelo Sodano, Italian cardinal (d. 2022)
1928 – Jerry Bock, American composer (d. 2010)
  1928   – John Coleman, Australian rules footballer and coach (d. 1973)
  1928   – Elmarie Wendel, American actress and singer (d. 2018)
1930 – Geeta Dutt, Indian singer and actress (d. 1972)
  1930   – Jack McKeon, American baseball player and manager
1932 – Michel David-Weill, French-American banker
1933 – Krzysztof Penderecki, Polish composer and conductor (d. 2020)
  1933   – Ali Shariati, Iranian sociologist and activist (d. 1977)
1934 – Lew Hoad, Australian tennis player (d. 1994)
  1934   – Robert Towne, American actor, director, and screenwriter
1935 – Ken Eastwood, Australian cricketer
  1935   – Vladislav Volkov, Russian engineer and astronaut (d. 1971)
1938 – Patrick Kelly, English archbishop
1939 – Betty Everett, American singer and pianist (d. 2001)
1940 – Luis Tiant, Cuban-American baseball player and coach
1941 – Alan Mullery, English footballer and manager
  1941   – Franco Nero, Italian actor and producer
1942 – Susan Anspach, American actress (d. 2018)
1943 – Andrew Goodman, American activist (d. 1964)
  1943   – Sue Nicholls, English actress
  1943   – David Nolan, American activist and politician (d. 2010)
  1943   – Petar Skansi, Croatian basketball player and coach (d. 2022)
1944 – Joe Eszterhas, Hungarian-American screenwriter and producer
  1944   – Peter Lindbergh, German-French photographer and director
  1944   – James Toback, American actor, director, and screenwriter
1945 – Assi Dayan, Israeli actor, director, and screenwriter (d. 2014)
  1945   – Jim Doyle, American lawyer and politician, 44th Governor of Wisconsin
  1945   – Tony Pond, English racing driver (d. 2002)
  1946   – Diana Quick, English actress
  1946   – Bobby Rush, American activist and politician
1947 – Jean-Pierre Foucault, French radio and television host
1948 – Bruce Vilanch, American actor and screenwriter
  1948   – Frank Worthington, English footballer and manager (d. 2021)
1949 – Alan Paul, American singer-songwriter and actor
  1949   – Sandra Stevens, English singer
1950 – Nrisingha Prasad Bhaduri, Indian indologist, author, and academic
  1950   – Carlos Eire, Cuban-born American author and academic
  1950   – Charles Schumer, American lawyer and politician
  1950   – Paul Wilson, Scottish footballer (d. 2017)
1951 – Maik Galakos, Greek footballer and manager
1952 – Bill Troiano, American tuba player and educator
1953 – Rick Bayless, American chef and author
  1953   – Francis Cabrel, French singer-songwriter and guitarist
  1953   – Johan de Meij, Dutch trombonist, composer, and conductor
  1953   – Martin Kent, Australian cricketer 
1954 – Pete Allen, English clarinet player and saxophonist 
  1954   – Glenn Brummer, American baseball player
  1954   – Bruce Hornsby, American singer-songwriter and pianist
  1954   – Aavo Pikkuus, Estonian cyclist
1955 – Steven Brust, American singer-songwriter, drummer, and author
  1955   – Ludovico Einaudi, Italian pianist and composer
  1955   – Mary Landrieu, American politician
1956 – Bruce Edgar, New Zealand cricketer
  1956   – Shane Gould, Australian swimmer and coach
  1956   – Karin Guthke, German diver
1958 – Martin Snedden, New Zealand cricketer and lawyer
1959 – Maxwell Caulfield, English-American actor
1960 – Robin Roberts, American sportscaster and journalist
1961 – Keith Ablow, American psychiatrist and author
  1961   – Nicolas Bacri, French composer
  1961   – Merv Hughes, Australian cricketer
  1961   – Peter Stanford, English journalist and author
1962 – Nicolás Maduro, Venezuelan union leader and politician, President of Venezuela
1963 – Arto Heiskanen, Finnish professional hockey player (d. 2023)
  1963   – Gwynne Shotwell, American businesswoman, President and Chief Operating Officer of SpaceX
1964 – Marilyn Kidd, Australian rower
  1964   – Frank Rutherford, Bahamian triple jumper
1965 – Jennifer Michael Hecht, American historian, author, and poet
1966 – Vincent Cassel, French actor and producer
  1966   – Kevin Gallacher, Scottish footballer and sportscaster
  1966   – Jerry Kelly, American golfer
  1967   – Gary Kirsten, South African cricketer and coach
  1967   – Salli Richardson, American actress, director, and producer
1968 – Robert Denmark, English runner and coach
  1968   – Anthony Sullivan, English rugby league and union player
  1968   – Kirsty Young, Scottish journalist
1969 – Olivier Beretta, Monégasque racing driver
  1969   – Mike Lünsmann, German footballer
  1969   – Robin Padilla, Filipino actor, martial artist, and screenwriter
1970 – Zoë Ball, English radio and television host
  1970   – Oded Fehr, Israeli-American actor
  1970   – Danny Hoch, American actor and screenwriter
  1970   – Karsten Müller, German chess player and author
1971 – Khaled Al-Muwallid, Saudi Arabian footballer
  1971   – Lisa Arch, American actress
  1971   – Vin Baker, American basketball player and coach
  1971   – Chris Hardwick, American comedian, actor, producer, and television host
1972 – Christopher James Adler, American drummer
1974 – Saku Koivu, Finnish ice hockey player
1976 – Tony Renna, American race car driver (d. 2003)
  1976   – Murat Salar, German-Turkish footballer and manager
  1976   – Kohei Suwama, Japanese wrestler
1977 – Myriam Boileau, Canadian diver
  1977   – Adam Eaton, American baseball player
1978 – Tommy Marth, American saxophonist (d. 2012)
1979 – Kelly Brook, English model and actress
  1979   – Ivica Kostelić, Croatian skier
1980 – Ishmael Beah, Sierra Leonean child soldier and American author
  1980   – Jonathan Papelbon, American baseball player
1982 – Colby Armstrong, Canadian ice hockey player
  1982   – Asafa Powell, Jamaican sprinter
  1983   – Fatih Yiğituşağı, Turkish footballer
1984 – Amruta Khanvilkar, Indian actress and dancer
  1984   – Justin Turner, American baseball player
1985 – Viktor An, South Korean speed skater
1987 – Nicklas Bäckström, Swedish ice hockey player
  1987   – Snooki, American reality television personality
1990 – Shaun Hutchinson, English footballer
  1990   – Eddy Kim, South Korean singer-songwriter and guitarist
  1990   – Alena Leonova, Russian figure skater
  1990   – Christopher Quiring, German footballer
1991 – Ahmed Shehzad, Pakistani cricketer
1992 – Miley Cyrus, American singer-songwriter and actress 
  1992   – Gabriel Landeskog, Swedish ice hockey player
1994 – Wes Burns, Welsh footballer
1995 – Kelly Rosen, Estonian footballer
1996 – Anna Yanovskaya, Russian ice dancer

Deaths

Pre-1600
 386 – Jin Feidi, emperor of the Jin Dynasty (b. 342)
 947 – Berthold, Duke of Bavaria (b. 900)
 955 – Eadred, English king (b. 923)
1161 – Adam, Abbot of Ebrach
1183 – William Fitz Robert, 2nd Earl of Gloucester (b. 1116)
1407 – Louis I, Duke of Orléans (b. 1372)
1457 – Ladislaus the Posthumous, Hungarian king (b. 1440)
1464 – Blessed Margaret of Savoy (b. 1390)
1499 – Perkin Warbeck, pretender to the English throne (b. c. 1474)
1503 – Bona of Savoy (b. 1449)
  1503   – Margaret of York (b. 1446)
1534 – Beatriz Galindo, Spanish Latinist and educator (b. c. 1465)
1572 – Bronzino, Italian painter and poet (b. 1503)
1585 – Thomas Tallis, English composer (b. c.1505)

1601–1900
1616 – Richard Hakluyt, English priest and author (b. 1552)
1682 – Claude Lorrain, French-Italian painter and engraver (b. 1604)
1763 – Friedrich Heinrich von Seckendorff, German field marshal and diplomat (b. 1673)
1769 – Constantine Mavrocordatos, Greek prince (b. 1711)
1803 – Roger Newdigate, English politician (b. 1719)
1804 – Richard Graves, English minister and author (b. 1715)
  1804   – Ivan Mane Jarnović, Italian violinist and composer (b. 1747)
1807 – Jean-François Rewbell, French lawyer and politician (b. 1747)
1814 – Elbridge Gerry, American merchant and politician, 5th Vice President of the United States (b. 1744)
1844 – Thomas Henderson, Scottish astronomer (b. 1798)
1833 – Jean-Baptiste Jourdan, French general and politician, French Minister of Foreign Affairs (b. 1762)
1890 – William III of the Netherlands (b. 1817)
1896 – Ichiyō Higuchi, Japanese writer (b. 1872)
1899 – Thomas Henry Ismay, English businessman, founded White Star Line (b. 1837)

1901–present
1905 – John Burdon-Sanderson, English physiologist and academic (b. 1828)
1907 – Naimuddin, Bengali writer and Islamic scholar (b. 1832)
1910 – Hawley Harvey Crippen, American physician and murderer (b. 1862)
1923 – Andy O'Sullivan, Irish Republican Hunger Striker
1927 – Miguel Pro, Mexican priest and martyr (b. 1891)
1934 – Giovanni Brunero, Italian cyclist (b. 1895)
1937 – Jagadish Chandra Bose, Bangladeshi-Indian physicist, biologist, botanist, and archaeologist (b. 1858)
  1937   – George Albert Boulenger, Belgian-English zoologist and botanist (b. 1858)
  1937   – Miklós Kovács, Hungarian-Slovene cantor and poet (b. 1857)
1940 – Stanley Argyle, Australian politician, 32nd Premier of Victoria (b. 1867)
1943 – Ernie Jones, Australian cricketer and footballer (b. 1869)
1948 – Hack Wilson, American baseball player (b. 1900)
1958 – Nikolaos Georgantas, Greek discus thrower (b. 1880)
  1958   – Johnston McCulley, American author and screenwriter (b. 1883)
1966 – Seán T. O'Kelly, Irish politician, 2nd President of Ireland (b. 1882)
1970 – Yusof Ishak, Singaporean journalist and politician, 1st President of Singapore (b. 1910)
1972 – Marie Wilson, American actress (b. 1916)
1973 – Sessue Hayakawa, Japanese actor, director, and producer (b. 1889)
1974 – Notable victims of the Massacre of the Sixty:
                Abiye Abebe, Ethiopian general and politician (b. 1918)
                Aman Andom, Ethiopian general and politician, President of Ethiopia (b. 1924)
                Aklilu Habte-Wold, Ethiopian politician, Prime Minister of Ethiopia (b. 1912)
                Asrate Kassa, Ethiopian commander (b. 1922)
                Endelkachew Makonnen, Ethiopian politician, Prime Minister of Ethiopia (b. 1927)
  1974   – Cornelius Ryan, Irish-American journalist and author (b. 1920)
1976 – André Malraux, French theorist and author (b. 1901)
1979 – Merle Oberon, Indian-born British actress (b. 1911)
  1979   – Judee Sill, American singer-songwriter and guitarist (b. 1944)
1982 – Grady Nutt, American minister and author (b. 1934)
1983 – Juhan Muks, Estonian painter (b. 1899)
  1983   – Waheed Murad, Pakistani actor, producer, and screenwriter (b. 1938)
1984 – Leonard Baker, American historian and author (b. 1931)
1990 – Roald Dahl, British novelist, poet, and screenwriter (b. 1916)
1991 – Klaus Kinski, German-American actor and director (b. 1926)
1992 – Roy Acuff, American singer-songwriter and fiddler (b. 1903)
  1992   – Jean-François Thiriart, Belgian politician (b. 1922)
1994 – Art Barr, American wrestler (b. 1966)
  1994   – Irwin Kostal, American songwriter, screenwriter, and publisher (b. 1911)
1995 – Louis Malle, French-American director, producer, and screenwriter (b. 1932)
  1995   – Junior Walker, American singer and saxophonist (b. 1931)
1996 – Mohamed Amin, Kenyan photographer and journalist (b. 1943)
  1996   – Art Porter, Jr., American saxophonist and songwriter (b. 1961)
  1996   – Idries Shah, Indian author, thinker and teacher in the Sufi tradition.
1997 – Jorge Mas Canosa, Cuban-American businessman (b. 1939)
2000 – Brian Rawlinson, English actor and playwright (b. 1931)
2001 – Bo Belinsky, American baseball player (b. 1936)
  2001   – Mary Whitehouse, English educator and activist (b. 1910)
2002 – Roberto Matta, Chilean-Italian painter and sculptor (b. 1911)
2004 – Pete Franklin, American radio host (b. 1928)
2005 – Constance Cummings, American-English actress (b. 1910)
  2005   – Frank Gatski, American football player and soldier (b. 1919)
2006 – Jesús Blancornelas, Mexican journalist, co-founded Zeta Magazine (b. 1936)
  2006   – Nick Clarke, English journalist (b. 1948)
  2006   – Betty Comden, American actress, singer, and screenwriter (b. 1917)
  2006   – Alexander Litvinenko, Russian spy and defector (b. 1962)
  2006   – Philippe Noiret, French actor (b. 1930)
  2006   – Anita O'Day, American singer (b. 1919)
  2006   – Willie Pep, American boxer and referee (b. 1922)
2007 – Joe Kennedy, American baseball player (b. 1979)
  2007   – Óscar Carmelo Sánchez, Bolivian footballer and manager (b. 1971)
  2007   – Robert Vesco, American-Cuban financier (b. 1935)
  2007   – Pat Walsh, New Zealand rugby union player (b. 1936)
2009 – José Arraño Acevedo, Chilean journalist and historian (b. 1921)
2010 – Nassos Daphnis, Greek-American painter and sculptor (b. 1914)
  2010   – Joyce Howard, English-American actress (b. 1922)
2011 – Jim Rathmann, American race car driver (b. 1928)
2012 – José Luis Borau, Spanish actor, director, producer, and screenwriter (b. 1929)
  2012   – Chuck Diering, American baseball player (b. 1923)
  2012   – Larry Hagman, American actor, director, and producer (b. 1931)
  2012   – Diana Isaac, English-New Zealand businesswoman and philanthropist (b. 1921)
2013 – Connie Broden, Canadian ice hockey player (b. 1932)
  2013   – Costanzo Preve, Italian philosopher and theorist (b. 1943)
2014 – Marion Barry, American lawyer and politician, 2nd Mayor of the District of Columbia (b. 1936)
  2014   – Dorothy Cheney, American tennis player (b. 1916)
  2014   – Murray Oliver, Canadian-American ice hockey player and coach (b. 1937)
  2014   – Pat Quinn, Canadian ice hockey player and coach (b. 1943)
2015 – Jamiluddin Aali, Pakistani poet, playwright, and critic (b. 1925)
  2015   – Manmeet Bhullar, Canadian lawyer and politician (b. 1980)
  2015   – Douglass North, American economist and academic, Nobel Prize laureate (b. 1920)
2016 – Rita Barberá Nolla, Spanish politician (b. 1948)
  2016   – Ralph Branca, American baseball player (b. 1926)
  2016   – Andrew Sachs, German-born British actor (b. 1930)
  2016   – Joe Esposito, road manager for Elvis Presley (b. 1938)
2017 – Stela Popescu, Romanian actress (b. 1935)
2020 – Tarun Gogoi, Indian Chief Minister of Assam (b. 1934)

Holidays and observances
 Christian feast day:
 Alexander Nevsky (Repose, Russian Orthodox Church)
 Blessed Miguel Agustín Pro – one of Saints of the Cristero War (Roman Catholic Church and the Lutheran Church)
 Columbanus
 Felicitas of Rome
 Paulinus of Wales
 Pope Clement I (Roman Catholic Church, the Anglican Communion, and the Lutheran Church)
 Trudo (or Trond)
 Wilfetrudis (or Vulfetrude)
 Labor Thanksgiving Day (Japan)
 Repudiation Day (Frederick County, Maryland, United States)
 Rudolf Maister Day (Slovenia)
 St George's Day (Georgia) or Giorgoba (Georgia)

References

External links

 
 
 

Days of the year
November